Faubourg St. John, is a neighborhood in New Orleans, Louisiana, located just north of Broad Street at the intersection of Orleans Avenue.  Faubourg St. John is approximately 75 city blocks in area and has an average elevation of about one foot above sea level.  It was built along what is known as the Esplanade Ridge. The Esplanade Ridge Historic District was added to the National Register of Historic Places in 1980.

More than 4,000 residents call Faubourg St. John (originally Faubourg Saint-Jean) home.  The word faubourg is French for neighborhood or suburb.

Faubourg St. John is known for its abundant parks, architecturally-significant homes, museums, the Bayou St. John waterway, and restaurants and shops along Ponce de Leon and Broad Streets.

History

The area near the end of the navigable section of Bayou St. John was long a Native American trade route.  Some French trappers and traders settled with the Native Americans by the end of the 17th century.  In 1708, the community of Port Bayou Saint-Jean was established here. The town predated the official founding of New Orleans, but it was not incorporated into the city boundaries until the start of the 19th century.

A 1730 account notes Mardi Gras celebrations here.  In 1794 the Carondelet Canal provided a navigable water link from the neighborhood to the city at the French Quarter.

A visitor at the start of the 19th century noted the neighborhood "has charming dance halls, cafes, and billiard parlors. The pleasures procured there by the young folks attract many people."

In 1852 the "Union Race Course" was laid out, later known as New Orleans Fair Grounds, it has long been a noted home to horse racing and other events. Since 1972 the Fair Grounds has been the venue for the New Orleans Jazz & Heritage Festival.

Landmarks 

New Orleans Fair Grounds
Pitot House,  the only Creole colonial house open to the public in New Orleans. It tells the story of life in the vicinity of Bayou St. John during the earliest times of settlement. The house is named for James Pitot, the second mayor of New Orleans, who resided there from 1810 to 1819. The house was restored to its former glory in the 1960s by the Louisiana Landmarks Association.
Dufour Plassan House, built in 1870. The house is known for tall white columns and its elaborate cornstalk and sunflower decorated fence.
 Lorreins Plantation House, aka the Old Spanish Customs House, at Moss Street and Grand Route St. John.
 Saint Louis Cemetery #3, a historic cemetery established in 1854.

Schools and education 
Cabrini High School is a girls' Catholic school located in Faubourg St. John which offers grades 8-12 and was founded in 1905 by Mother Francesca Cabrini.

McDonough City Park Academy is a K-5 school.

Recent development

The current goal of the Faubourg St. John Neighborhood Association (FSJNA) is to revamp the worn Desmare Playground at 3456 Esplanade Avenue.  Plans include making the playground a more welcoming place for children, with the addition of a swing set and complete replacement of the playground equipment.

Neighborhood association

The Faubourg St. John Neighborhood Association (FSJNA) has been around in one form or another since the 1920s.  It was registered with the state in 1977.  FSJNA is a benevolent group interested in continuing improvements in this historic New Orleans neighborhood through its people, children, historic waterway, public spaces and other environs.  FSJNA has participated in numerous beautification efforts throughout Faubourg St. John from parks and playgrounds to simple street plantings.  FSJNA works to keep its membership informed.  It also reaches out to other non-profits and bordering neighborhood organizations, through its participation in area festivals, cultural events, community workshops, and informational seminars.

See also
Bayou St. John, New Orleans, another neighborhood 
Neighborhoods in New Orleans

References

External links

Faubourg St. John Neighborhood Association

Neighborhoods in New Orleans
Populated places established in 1708